Taşköprü ( "stone bridge") is a town in Kastamonu Province in the Black Sea region of Turkey. It is the seat of Taşköprü District. Its population is 17,048 (2021).

The town takes its name from the stone bridge constructed in the 13th century by the Chobanids over the Gök River. The 68 meter span is supported on seven arches and still carries automobile traffic. Taşköprü is 42 km from Kastamonu. It is noted for its garlic; the name Taşköprü Sarımsağı is a protected designation of origin (PDO).

History
In its history, the district has been one of the important settlements of several civilizations. In 64 BC it became part of the Roman Empire. During Ottoman rule, Taşköprü was part of Kastamonu Eyalet, and later Kastamonu Vilayet.

See also
 Pompeiopolis

References

Further reading
 Latife Summerer, Pompeiopolis-Taşköprü. 2000 Years between Metropolis and County Town (İstanbul 2017).

Populated places in Kastamonu Province
Taşköprü District
Towns in Turkey
Paphlagonia

la:Pompeiopolis in Paphlagonia